"Circles" is the third single from Cavo's second studio album, Thick as Thieves.

2012 songs
Cavo songs